is a Japanese actress, model and a former member of Japanese idol girl group AKB48.

Career

Mitsumune was born in Ehime Prefecture in 1993. As her parents moved around for work, she spent time in Chiba, Hiroshima and Kanagawa Prefectures before settling in Osaka for high school. In March 2011, Mitsumune won the Grand Prix at the Kobe Collection Model Audition 2011. In December of the same year, she joined AKB48 as part of the 13th generation trainee members. She made her television drama debut in Ataru aired on TBS in April 2012. On October 24, 2012, she announced that she would leave the group due to her poor physical condition. She played the lead role for the first time in the film Joshi Camera, and it was released on November 24, 2012.

Mitsumune made a comeback to the entertainment industry appearing in the film Gekijōban Ataru The First Love & The Last Kill released on September 14, 2013. On April, 2014, it was announced that she belonged to the agency Flave Entertainment, and she resumed her activity in full swing.

Discography

Singles with AKB48

Albums with AKB48
 1830m
 "Sakuranbo to Kodoku" (Kenkyūsei)
 "Aozora yo Sabishikunai Ka?" (AKB48 + SKE48 + NMB48 + HKT48)

Stage units
 Team A 6th Stage "Mokugekisha"

 Team K 6th Stage "Reset"
 "Kiseki wa Maniawanai"

 Team B 5th Stage "Theater no Megami"
 "Romance Kakurenbo"

 AKB48 Kenkyūsei Stage "Reset"
 "Kiseki wa Maniawanai"
 "Ashita no Tame ni Kiss o"

 AKB48 Kenkyūsei Stage "Boku no Taiyō"
 "Boku to Juliet to Jet Coaster"

Appearances

Movies
 Gekijōban Shiritsu Bakaleya Koukou (2012), Sayuri Tokimune
 Joshi Camera (2012), Miki Yoshizawa
 Gekijōban Ataru The First Love & The Last Kill (2013), Yui Ishikawa
 Piece of Cake (2015), Akari Narita(Naomi Shibuya)
 Room Laundering (2018)

Television
 Shiritsu Bakaleya Koukou (NTV, 2012), Sayuri Tokimune
 Ataru (TBS, 2012), Yui Ishikawa
 Mare (NHK, 2015), Yukari Adachi
 Ushijima the Loan Shark (MBS, 2016), Mayumi Uehara

Dubbing
 The Blacklist Season 2 Episode 1 (Super! Drama TV, 2015), Rowan Mills

Commercials
 Asahi Soft Drinks - Wanda Morning Shot (2012)
 Hewlett-Packard Japan (2012)
 Sunstar Group - Sunstar Tonic (2014)

Music videos
 Shinsei Kamattechan - Jibun Rashiku (2015)

Events
 Girls Award 2014 S/S, 2014 A/W
 Tokyo Runway 2014 S/S, 2014 A/W, 2015 S/S
 Kobe Collection 2011 Shanghai, 2014 S/S, 2014 A/W, 2016 S/S
 Kansai Collection 2014 S/S, 2016 S/S

Bibliography

Magazines
 Oggi, Shogakukan 1991-, as a regular model since December 2014 issue

Awards
 Kobe Collection Model Audition (2011): Grand Prix

References

External links 
  
  
 

Living people
1993 births
People from Ehime Prefecture
People from Osaka
Japanese female models
21st-century Japanese women singers
21st-century Japanese singers
21st-century Japanese actresses
Models from Ehime Prefecture